Cordélia is a 1980 Canadian French language film directed and written by Jean Beaudin. It is an adaptation of the novel La lampe dans la fenêtre by Pauline Cadieux, itself based on the real-life 1890s murder trial of Cordélia Viau and Samuel Parslow.

Plot 
Set in a village in the 1890s, the film centres on Cordélia Viau (Louise Portal), a woman who invites men into her home while her husband is away. This action offends the conservative villagers. One of the men who was invited in is found dead and the woman is suspected and judged for her immoral act rather than the crime of murder she may have committed.

Cast

Critical response
Mark Leslie of Cinema Canada favourably reviewed the film, writing that "Like Beaudin's last feature, J.A. Martin photographe, Cordelia is also a sumptuous period piece of pastel colours, soft, expressive lighting and glimpses of a visually beautiful past. But occasionally the prettiness of these images creates a discord in the film, not unlike that resulting from the unexplained plot details already discussed. The beautiful light in the jail makes Cordelia's imprisonment appear unnecessarily romantic."

The film was one of two, alongside Jean-Claude Labrecque's The Coffin Affair (L'Affaire Coffin), which was criticized by justice Jules Deschênes of the Quebec Superior Court for having purportedly erred in points of law. According to Deschênes, there was no evidence that the real Cordélia Viau had not committed the murder, and thus the film's thesis that she was wrongfully convicted was slanderous to the judicial system.

Awards
The film received seven Genie Award nominations at the 1st Genie Awards in 1980.

References

External links

1980 films
Films based on Canadian novels
National Film Board of Canada films
Films directed by Jean Beaudin
Films set in Quebec
Films set in the 1890s
Films scored by Maurice Blackburn
Canadian crime drama films
French-language Canadian films
1980s Canadian films